Pete Sampras defeated Cédric Pioline in the final, 6–4, 6–4, 6–3 to win the men's singles tennis title at the 1993 US Open.

Stefan Edberg was the two-time defending champion, but lost in the second round to Karel Novacek.

Seeds
The seeded players are listed below. Pete Sampras is the champion; others show the round in which they were eliminated.

  Jim Courier (fourth round)
  Pete Sampras (champion)
  Stefan Edberg (second round)
  Boris Becker (fourth round)
  Sergi Bruguera (first round)
  Michael Stich (first round)
  Michael Chang (quarterfinalist)
  Andrei Medvedev (quarterfinalist)
  Petr Korda (first round)
  Richard Krajicek (fourth round)
  Goran Ivanišević (second round)
  Thomas Muster (quarterfinalist)
  Ivan Lendl (first round)
  Alexander Volkov (semifinalist)
  Cédric Pioline (finalist)
  Andre Agassi (first round)

Qualifying

Draw

Final eight

Section 1

Section 2

Section 3

Section 4

Section 5

Section 6

Section 7

Section 8

External links
 Association of Tennis Professionals (ATP) – 1993 US Open Men's Singles draw
1993 US Open – Men's draws and results at the International Tennis Federation

Men's singlesMen's singles
US Open (tennis) by year – Men's singles